The Garschella Formation is an early Aptian to early Cenomanian geologic formation in the Alps of Austria, France, Germany and Switzerland. It preserves fossils dated to the Cretaceous period.

See also 
 List of fossiliferous stratigraphic units in Austria
 List of fossiliferous stratigraphic units in France
 List of fossiliferous stratigraphic units in Germany
 List of fossiliferous stratigraphic units in Switzerland

References

External links 
 

Geologic formations of Austria
Geologic formations of France
Geologic formations of Germany
Geologic formations of Switzerland
Cretaceous Austria
Cretaceous France
Cretaceous Germany
Cretaceous Europe
Albian Stage
Aptian Stage
Cenomanian Stage
Limestone formations
Geology of the Alps